The 2015–16 season was the 136th season of competitive football by Rangers.

Overview
Rangers played a total of 50 competitive matches during the 2015-16 season.

In early June, Ibrox Stadium played host to the companies second EGM in just over three months. A majority of shareholders voted in favour of a board resolution to renegotiate existing retail agreements with Sports Direct and voted against the early repayment of a loan from Mike Ashley. Rangers made further appointments to the board with Stewart Robertson joining as managing director and Andrew Dickinson being promoted to financial director.

The spectre of the previous board loomed large at the beginning of the season as Police Scotland's investigation into the sale of Rangers' assets to a consortium led by Charles Green led to arrests and seven indictments. On 1 September, both Craig Whyte and Green were arrested as part of the inquiry into the "alleged fraudulent acquisition" of Rangers' assets in 2012. Just over two weeks later indictments were served on seven accused, including Green and Whyte, David Whitehouse, Paul Clark, David Grier, who were all working for administrators Duff and Phelps at the time, Gary Withey who worked for a law firm involved in the purchase of Rangers by Whyte and Imran Ahmad, a former Rangers commercial director. Indeed, the latter indicated that he would not co-operate with the proceedings, subsequently a warrant was issued for his arrest and charges against him were temporarily stopped. A week later, Green took the company to the Court of Session in an attempt to force the PLC to pay his legal fees with regards to the forthcoming trial, however, the action was dismissed by Lord Doherty a few months later and an appeal to the Inner House  was also refused in March 2016. On 30 October, Rangers announced it was not appropriate to proceed with a share issue and listing on the ISDX market until the criminal proceedings being brought against Charles Green, Imran Ahmed, Craig Whyte and others was concluded. On 5 February 2016, prosecutors have withdrawn six of 15 charges brought against six men in the alleged Rangers fraud case which resulted in all charges against Duff and Phelps administrators David Whitehouse and Paul Clark being dropped, although prosecutors indicated there would be filing fresh charges against the pair. Charges against Green were also dropped meaning that the former chief executive of the club was not facing any. A few months later, in May 2016, it was announced that charges against Gary Withey and David Grier were dropped and they would not stand trial alongside former Rangers owner Craig Whyte, the only person still facing charges. In December 2020, the Lord Advocate James Wolffe admitted in court that the treatment of Whitehouse and Clark amounted to malicious prosecution, and they received a settlement of more than £20 million in compensation.

Fireworks night 2015 arrived a day early in Govan as 4 November proved to be a contentious day in the history of Rangers. The club's PLC owner, Rangers International Football Club, announced a loss of £7.5m for the year ending June 2015. This meant the company was required to find approximately £2.5m in order to cover expenses for the rest of the season. Moreover, the outcome of HMRC's appeal against the decision of the First-tier Tribunal regarding the previous owner and its use of EBT's. The Court of Session ruled that the use of Employee Benefit Trusts broke tax rules therefore the payments were eligible for tax deductions, although an appeal to the Supreme Court was sought less than a month later and granted in March 2016. This judgement caused debate in Scottish football as many people erroneously believed the decision made by the Nimmo Smith commission not to strip Rangers of titles was based on the outcome of the tax case. Coincidentally, the Commission's ruling was taken to an arbitration tribunal by the club's owners with RIFC PLC disputing its liability for the £250,000 fine plus £150,000 in additional costs, imposed on the company that previously owned the club. The SPFL subsequently imposed this on the new owners of the club as part of the terms of the five way agreement. However, an independent SFA tribunal ruled that RIFC PLC was liable for the fine in March 2016. Further legal matters occurred a week later, although not directly involving Rangers, as Mike Ashley lodged a challenge to the SFA's decision to pass King as a fit and proper person by seeking a Judicial review, however, the litigation was abandoned in April 2016 after his legal team received information about King's finances which the SFA used in their fit and proper deliberations. Ashley had also raised court proceedings against Dave King, accusing him of breaching a court injunction regarding the commercial agreements between Rangers and Sports Direct, however, the Royal Courts of Justice dismissed the motion for him to be jailed, moreover, a further accusation that King committed contempt of court was cleared. In the end, the court action against King was discontinued by Sports Direct as the company halted litigation claiming a breach of confidentiality in relation to a commercial deal, in which the Judge called "ridiculous".

The end of November saw the PLC's Annual general meeting, however, prior to this Mike Ashley continued with his ligation against the company and successfully managed to have Resolution 11 withdrawn which would have allowed shareholders to block the voting rights of dual ownership shareholders. The AGM passed without major incident however, the Chairman Dave King announced the adoption of the Living wage for company employees and the repayment of a £5m loan from Ashley's Sports Direct. Although on 11 December, it was reported that the company had not repaid the £5m loan despite earlier claims to the contrary. That same day it was reported that former Rangers player Arnold Peralta had been shot dead in his hometown of La Ceiba, Honduras. On Christmas Eve Rangers announced that the loan had been repaid to Ashley in full and it was later revealed, on Ne'erday, that Rangers had borrowed £6.5m from King an others in order to do this. On 4 February, it was announced by the Rangers board that they had given Sports Direct formal notice that they wish to end their retail deal for club merchandise. On 18 May, Rangers indicated its intention to end the joint venture with Sports Direct for selling club kits and merchandise, this included the withdrawal of the rights to use club trademarks.

On the football front, Rangers appointed its fourteenth permanent manager on 15 June in the shape of Mark Warburton, who agreed a three-year contract. Warburton was joined at the club by former Rangers centre-back David Weir who became his assistant manager. The start to the season saw Rangers embark on a run of eleven straight victories in all competitions. This helped Warburton overtake former Rangers manager Bill Struth’s record of eight consecutive wins by a manager at the beginning of there Ibrox career. Ultimately, this would could not continue, the series of victories came to an abrupt halt in mid-September as the club suffered a 3-1 defeat to St Johnstone in the League Cup. Despite this, Rangers league form continued to impress with the team continuing a winning steak for the first eleven games of the season which gave the club an eight-point lead, over second place Hibernian, at the top of the table by late October. However, the side was to go through a poor run of form thereafter collecting eight points from a possible eighteen over the next six league games including two defeats to Hibernian and Falkirk respectively. This left Rangers tied with the Edinburgh club on forty-one points ahead of crucial match between the two during the festive period. Rangers played Hibernian on 28 December at Ibrox, beating Alan Stubbs' side 4-2 then embarked on an unbeaten run of ten matches, winning nine with only Alloa Athletic managing to get a draw. Alongside this rich vain of form, second placed Hibernian suffered a run of three defeats within a week to see them trail Rangers at the top of the table by fourteen points as the season entered March. The league crown was secured on 5 April at Ibrox and formed the first part of a brace of trophies within a week. The team qualified for its second Challenge Cup final in the space of three years with the match being played at Hampden Park for the first time in the competition's history. The match was played in front of a near sell out as Rangers ran out 4-0 winners over Scottish League One side Peterhead on 10 April. Similarly, in Scottish Cup, the club reached its second semi-final in three seasons, setting up the first Old Firm derby in over a year. A highly anticipated match ended with both sides tied after full and extra time with Rangers winning the penalty shoot-out to progress to the final. The semi-final heroics were ultimately for nothing as Rangers lost the 2016 Scottish Cup Final to Hibernian with the Edinburgh club scoring an injury time winner. However, their victory was marred by a pitch invasion by Hibernian fans at the full-time whistle. The SFA has said it is "appalled" by scenes of disorder and set-up a commission to review operational failings apparent from the day. Police Scotland also undertook investigations into the matter which included several assaults on Rangers players and staff.

The football departments scouting network was overhauled with the appointment of Frank McParland as the Head of Recruitment. On 18 December, Rangers announced a coaching and development partnership with Scottish Lowland League club Gala Fairydean Rovers which effectively saw the Galashiels side act as a feeder to Rangers. On 6 January, Rangers began preparation for life in the Scottish Premiership by signing Accrington Stanley duo Josh Windass and Matt Crooks on pre-contract agreements. However, further success in the transfer market was not automatically forthcoming with bids being rejected in January for Toumani Diagouraga and Michael O'Halloran by Brentford and St. Johnstone respectively, however, a deal for the latter was eventually agreed after prolonged negotiations.

Players

Squad information

Transfers

In

First-team

Total expenditure: £1.165m

Academy

Total expenditure: £0m

Out

First-team

Total income: £0m

Academy

Total income: £0m

New contracts

First-team

Academy

Squad statistics

Goal scorers

Last updated: 21 May 2016
Source: Match reports
Only competitive matches

Disciplinary record

Awards

|}

Club

Board of directors
Rangers International Football Club Plc

 

The Rangers Football Club Ltd

Coaching staff
First-team

Other staff

Matches

Scottish Championship

Scottish Cup

League Cup

Challenge Cup

Friendlies

Competitions

Overall

Scottish Championship

Standings

Results summary

Results by round

References 

2015-16
Scottish football clubs 2015–16 season